Ray Gracie (1 September 1917 – 15 March 1998) was an  Australian rules footballer who played with St Kilda in the Victorian Football League (VFL).

Notes

External links 

1917 births
1998 deaths
Australian rules footballers from Victoria (Australia)
St Kilda Football Club players
Prahran Football Club players